is a passenger railway station located in the city of Fukaya, Saitama, Japan, operated by the private railway operator Chichibu Railway.

Lines

Station layout
The station has a 110 m long side platform enabling Paleo Express steam-hauled services to stop.

Adjacent stations

History
The Chichibu Railway officially announced its plans to built the new station on 14 June 2017.

Construction of the station commenced in June 2017, with the city of Fukaya bearing the entire cost of approximately JPY400 million. The station opened to passengers on 20 October 2018.

Surrounding area
The station is located in the Kuroda district of the city of Fukaya, and provides access to the nearby Hanazono Premium Outlet Mall scheduled to open in October 2020.
 Kan-Etsu Expressway (Hanazono Interchange)

See also
 List of railway stations in Japan

References

External links

Stations of Chichibu Railway
Railway stations in Saitama Prefecture
Railway stations in Japan opened in 2018
Fukaya, Saitama